The Fugs is a 1966 album by The Fugs, described in their AllMusic profile as "arguably the first underground rock group of all time". The album charted number 95 on Billboard's "Top Pop Albums" chart. The album was re-released on CD in 1993 as The Fugs Second Album on the Fantasy label with five additional tracks: two live performances and three tracks recorded for Atlantic in 1967 for an album that was never released. In its review of the re-release, AllMusic finds them "very ahead of their time lyrically" and compares them to the punk band Dead Kennedys, both lyrically and in their shared "weakness for crude humor".

In 2003, David Bowie included it in a list of 25 of his favourite albums, "Confessions of a Vinyl Junkie".

History
After the release of their first album on Folkways Records, The Fugs signed a contract allowing ESP-Disk to publish its material in exchange for usage of an Off-Broadway theater as practice space and what Fugs' frontman Ed Sanders describes as "one of the lower percentages in the history of western civilization. While finding the contract binding and disadvantageous in many ways, The Fugs were pleased with the opportunity to work with and at the studio of Richard Alderson, who allowed them to experiment with his state-of-the-art equipment. The album was produced over a four-week period through January and February 1966 at the same time that the band was performing weekly  at the Astor Place Playhouse and making television appearances with David Susskind and Les Crane. The band's controversial lyrics and stage antics allegedly attracted the attention of the FBI and New York City fire and building inspectors and eventually resulted in their being banned from Astor Place Playhouse. According to Sanders, the FBI's final report of its investigation of the band concluded that "The Fugs is a group of musicians who perform in NYC. They are considered to be beatniks and free thinkers, i.e., free love, free use of narcotics, etc. .... it is recommended that this case be placed in a closed status since the recording is not considered to be obscene." Sanders jokes that "If we'd only known about this, we could have put a disclaimer on the record, 'Ruled NOT obscene by the FBI!'"

Track listing

Personnel

Performance
John Anderson – bass guitar, vocals
Lee Crabtree – piano, celeste, bells
Pete Kearney – guitar
Betsy Klein – vocals
Tuli Kupferberg – maracas, tambourine, vocals
Vinny Leary – bass, guitar
Ed Sanders – vocals
Ken Weaver – conga, drums, vocals

Production
Richard Alderson – engineer
Bill Beckman – cover design
Allen Ginsberg – liner notes
Jim Nelson – photography

References

The Fugs albums
1966 albums
ESP-Disk albums
Albums produced by Ed Sanders